The second season of Next Great Baker was televised from November 28, 2011 to January 30, 2012 on TLC. This season was set at the new Carlo's Bake Shop facility at Lackawanna Center in Jersey City, New Jersey.

During this season, the Next Great Baker would win $100,000 cash and a four-page spread in Brides magazine. The winner will also get to work beside Buddy in the bakery, with the winner's first day covered in the episode of Cake Boss following the season finale on January 30, 2012.

Contestants
Thirteen contestants competed during this season:

Contestant progress

 (WINNER) This baker won the competition.
 (RUNNER-UP) This baker was the runner-up of the competition.
 (THIRD) This baker placed third overall in the competition.
 (WIN) The baker won individual immunity and the elimination challenge.
 (WIN) The baker(s) won the challenge.
 (HIGH) The baker(s) had one of the best cakes for that challenge, but did not win.
 (IN) The baker(s) advanced to the next week.
 (LOW) The baker(s) was/were a part of the team who lost, but was not the last to move on.
 (LOW) The baker(s) had the worst cake of those who advanced, and was/were the last to move on.
 (OUT) The baker(s) was/were eliminated.
 (IN) The baker(s) had immunity.

Notes

Episode guide

Production notes
Shortly after Wesley Durden was eliminated from the competition, he committed suicide on October 24, 2011. Following the telecast on December 19, 2011, when he was eliminated, the program gave the following on-screen tribute after his box truck sendoff: TLC extends its deepest condolences to the family, friends and colleagues of Sgt. Wesley Durden, who died October 24. He will be warmly remembered by the cast and crew of "Next Great Baker". TLC opted to delay the announcement of his death until after his elimination was telecast, as the network did not want his death to overshadow the competition.

At the start of the competition, Heather Grubb was 7.5 months into her pregnancy; because of this, reasonable accommodations were made so that the competition would not affect her pregnancy—such accommodations included wearing non-slip shoes instead of skates in "Bakers On Ice", and refraining from heavy lifting. Shortly before the finale's airdate of January 30, 2012, Heather gave birth to her daughter, which she introduced with her husband on the Finale Pre-Show.

References

General references 
 
 
 

2011 American television seasons
2012 American television seasons
Next Great Baker